Tirutakkatevar was a Tamil Jain poet who wrote Cīvaka Cintāmaṇi, one of The Five Great Epics of Tamil Literature. He, as a local king, also supported Kambar, one of the most famous poets of Tamil literature.

See also

Tamil Jain

References

Tamil epic poets
Epic poets
13th-century Indian Jain poets